Incarville is a commune in the Eure department in northern France.  Louviers is a neighboring city.

Population

See also
Communes of the Eure department

References

Communes of Eure